The Sultan Muhammed IV Stadium is a stadium in the state of Kelantan. It is located on Jalan Mahmood, Kota Bharu, Kelantan, Malaysia, and the home of Kelantan FC and Kelantan United, a Malaysia football team. The stadium can accommodate up to 22,000 spectators. At this time, this stadium is the largest in the East Coast of Peninsular Malaysia with seating capacity of 22,000 and a pitch area to meet the standards set by the National Sports Council of Malaysia is measuring 119 meters long and 100 meters wide.

The stadium is always full of supporters of Kelantan FA. Therefore, it was called the Red Warriors Stadium by the fanatical supporters of Kelantan FA.

History 
Sultan Muhammad IV Stadium is one of the oldest football field in Malaysia and probably one of the oldest in Asia continent based on the use of field. The stadium was built in 1967 and initially aims to provide a venue for sports activities from Kelantan, especially as a football pitch. The stadium was built in an area of 13 acres at a cost of RM 1.5 million, was built in stages.

It was built on the site of a football field of Kelantan Football Association and located in the heart of Kota Bharu town centre. The stadium initially managed by the Association of Kelantan Stadium, which is chaired by the Menteri Besar of the state of Kelantan and comprises a total of 30 members made up of government employees as well as representatives of sports associations.

Facilities 
Their main facilities involve football since it is a home ground for, Kelantan FA. Apart from football facilities, the stadium complex also has tennis courts, race tracks, sports facilities, business facilities to be rented as, warehouses, office space, exhibition sites, kiosks and public toilets. It also provides recreational facilities and a Surau.

The stadium also situated near to government offices such as Raja Perempuan Zainab II Hospital, Kelantan Police Headquarters and the Kota Bharu Municipal council. The stadium is also close to Kentucky Fried Chicken (KFC), a fast food outlet. Besides that, there are Perdana Specialist Hospital and Perdana Hotel not far from the stadium.

The stadium is surrounded by many restaurants, food stalls and retail stores. It become a place for people around the pedestal to find a food. There are Dataran Stadium Sultan Muhammad IV near the main entrance of the stadium. Usually, carnivals or events held there especially involving The Red Warriors team. There is also parking around the stadium, but very limited. Usually when the matches involving The Red Warriors was held, the audience just parking them on the pavement and it cause a massive traffic jam for the road nearby.

Transport 
Distance between Kota Bharu bus station and taxi station to the stadium is about 1 km. You can take a bus, taxi or on foot. There are bus stops not far from the stadium main entrance.

Electronic scoreboard 
An Electronic LED Scoreboard system was installed at the stadium in late 2012. It was first deployed during the international match AFC Cup 2012 Quarter Final between Kelantan FA and Iraq Football Club, Arbil Soccer Club. The Scoreboard costs RM2.36 million where the funding came from the Malaysian Federal Government. The project was supervised by the Jabatan Pembangunan Persekutuan and designed by a local Audio Visual consultant appointed by the stadium. The size of the LED scoreboard is about 6×11 meters and could display high resolution video. The LED component came from an LED industry leader called Nicchia and imported from Japan. It is considered the best electronic scoreboard in the country in terms of resolution.

The system is also equipped with a Multi-camera video production system which consists of slow-motion unit, digital video effects and graphics system. The system has 3 HD robotic cameras installed under the roof of the stadium and 3 HD portable professional video cameras. One of the HD portable camera has a HD video transmitter system which enable the camera (Fan-Cam) to send stable live video from anywhere in the stadium back to the control room for display on the LED scoreboard. The entire system was imported from the United States and similar system is used by major stadiums in the United States. The system is also capable of bringing live TV programs via the internet (live video streaming) as well as recording the video programs on HD. The stadium is the first stadium in Malaysia to install such HD multi-camera video production system. It

International matches

2011

2012

2013

2014

See also 
 Sport in Malaysia
 Kelantan FA President and Youth

References

External links 

 Sultan Muhammad IV Stadium at theredwarriorsfc.com
 Sultan Muhammad IV Stadium at kelantan.gov.my

Kota Bharu
Football venues in Malaysia
Athletics (track and field) venues in Malaysia
Multi-purpose stadiums in Malaysia
Kelantan FA
Sports venues in Kelantan
MPKB-BRI U-BeS F.C.